1221 Avenue of the Americas (formerly also known as the McGraw-Hill Building) is an international-style skyscraper at 1221 Sixth Avenue, in Midtown Manhattan, New York City. The 51-floor structure has a seven-story base and a simple, cuboid massing. The facade has no decoration and consists of red granite piers alternating with glass stripes to underline the tower's verticality.

The building  is set back  from Sixth Avenue, with a sunken courtyard dominated by Sun Triangle, an  abstract steel sculpture by Athelstan Spilhaus. The tower's lobby is clad in dark red terrazzo and red marble, with aphorisms by Plato and John F. Kennedy.

Background

The building was part of the later Rockefeller Center expansion (1960s–1970s) dubbed the "XYZ Buildings". Their plans were first drawn in 1963 by the Rockefeller family's architect, Wallace Harrison, of the architectural firm Harrison & Abramovitz. Their letters correspond to their height. 1251 Avenue of the Americas is the "X" Building as it is the tallest at 750 ft (229 m) and 54 stories, and was the first completed, in 1971. The "Y" is 1221 Avenue of the Americas, which was the second tower completed (1973) and is the second in height (674 ft and 51 stories). The "Z" Building, the shortest and the youngest, is 1211 Avenue of the Americas with 45 stories (592 ft).

The building was previously the headquarters of McGraw-Hill Financial. Other tenants include Sirius XM Satellite Radio, whose headquarters and broadcast facility are in the building, and the law firms Mayer Brown and White & Case.

The sunken courtyard contains a large metal triangle designed by Athelstan Spilhaus and fabricated by Tyler Elevator Products, arranged so the Sun aligns with its sides at solstices and equinoxes. When built, the southwestern corner held a display of scale models of planets in the Solar System. A mosaic map of the Earth survives in the northwestern corner.

In 2009, the structure earned a LEED green-building certification. A renovation of the plaza and retail space was announced in 2017, and the $50 million project was underway by 2022.

1999 elevator incident
After entering an express elevator serving floors 39-50 at approximately 11:00 p.m. (EDT) Friday on October 15, 1999, Nicholas White, a Business Week employee whose office was in the building, became trapped in an elevator after a brief power dip caused it to stop between the 13th and 14th floors. White was not rescued until approximately 4:00 p.m. on Sunday, October 17, nearly 41 hours later, after security guards spotted him in the elevator surveillance cameras.

In popular culture
The buildings are featured in the title sequence of Saturday Night Live, seen from below looking up in the street from a car. It was used for the exteriors and lobby of Elias-Clarke's headquarters in the 2006 film The Devil Wears Prada and the interior shots for Suits. It is also the headquarters of Sirius XM Radio, and many radio shows broadcast from the building including The Howard Stern Show. The plaza and sculpture are also featured as part of the New York City Level of the video game Tony Hawk's Pro Skater 2.

See also

 List of tallest buildings in New York City
 1211 Avenue of the Americas
 1251 Avenue of the Americas

References

External links
 
 Critical review of the building's design
 in-Arch.net: The McGraw-Hill Building
 Skyscraperpage.com

Rockefeller Center
Skyscraper office buildings in Manhattan
Mass media company headquarters in the United States
Sixth Avenue
Office buildings completed in 1969